Silver molybdate (Ag2MoO4), a chemical compound, is a yellow, cubic crystalline substance often used in glass. Its crystals present two types of electronic structure, depending on the pressure conditions to which the crystal is subjected. At room temperature, Ag2MoO4 exhibits a spinel-type cubic structure, known as β-Ag2MoO4, which is more stable in nature. However, when exposed to high hydrostatic pressure, the tetragonal α-Ag2MoO4 forms as a metastable phase.

Synthesis and properties 
Research published in 2015 reported the formation of α-Ag2MoO4 by solution-phase precipitation under ambient conditions, using 3-bis(2-pyridyl)pyrazine (dpp) as a doping agent. The influence of the pH of the starting solution on the growth and formation processes of distinct heterostructures (brooms, flowers and rods) was investigated by Singh et al. and Fodjo et al., in which sodium borohydride was employed to induce the reduction of silver nanoparticles on the surface of Ag2MoO4 crystals in order to enhance Raman scattering. In other studies, Ag-Ag2MoO4 composites prepared by microwave-assisted hydrothermal synthesis presented interesting photocatalytic activity for the degradation of rhodamine B under visible light. In addition, Ag2MoO4 mixed with graphite acts as a good lubricant for Ni-based composites, improving the tribological properties of this system. Different synthetic methods have been employed to obtain pure β-Ag2MoO4 crystals, including solid-state reaction or oxide mixture at high temperature, melt-quenching, and Czochralski growth. Particularly, high temperatures, long processing times, and/or sophisticated equipment are necessary in these synthetic routes. Moreover, the final products may be composed of irregular particle shapes with nonhomogeneous size distribution as well as contain the presence of secondary phases. In recent years, pure β-Ag2MoO4 crystals have been synthesized by co-precipitation, microwave-assisted hydrothermal synthesis, a dynamic template route using polymerization of acrylamide assisted templates, and an impregnation/calcination method.

In 2015, the literature reported the formation of β-Ag2MoO4 crystals using different chemical solvents in the reaction medium. These β-Ag2MoO4 microcrystals were synthesized by the precipitation method, employing several polar solvents: deionized water (H2O), methanol (CH4O), ethanol (C2H6O), 1-propanol (C3H8O) and 1-butanol (C4H10O) at 60 °C for 8 h. X-ray diffraction (XRD), Rietveld refinements and field emission scanning electron microscopy (FESEM) were employed in structural and morphological characterizations. Moreover, some researchers have investigated new ways to improve the photocatalytic properties of β–Ag2MoO4 crystals through hydrothermal processing at different temperatures (100, 120, 140 and 160 °C) for 2 h and replacement of Ag atoms by Zn to formation of silver zinc molybdate [β–(Ag2−2xZnx)MoO4] microcrystals by a sonochemical method at 30 °C for 3 h. These new crystals were able to degrade the organic cationic dye rhodamine B and the anionic dye Remazol Brilliant Violet 5R

References

Silver compounds
Molybdates